Kutty may refer to:

Kutty (surname), in India
Kutty (cartoonist) an Indian cartoonist

Films
Kutty (2001 film)
Kutty (2010 film)
Kutty Story